Varandiavel is a panchayat and village in the Thoothukudi district of India.

References

Villages in Thoothukudi district